Murat Gülsoy (born 1967) is a Turkish writer. He started his literary career as a publisher and a writer of the bimonthly magazine Hayalet Gemi (Ghost Ship) in 1992.  His works explore the metafictive potential of postmodern self-consciousness with ‘page turning’ plots. He also produced interactive hypertext works on internet exploring new ways of narrative. Gülsoy has published 18 books in Turkey so far. Besides short stories, he has eight novels addressing modern masters Kafka, Borges, Eco, Laurence Sterne, Fowles and Orhan Pamuk. He is the recipient of some of the most prestigious national literary awards. He conducts creative writing workshops since 2004. Besides being a writer, he is also a professor with Bogazici University at Institute of Biomedical Engineering. He is the head of the editorial board of Bogazici University Press and director of Bogazici University Nazım Hikmet Culture and Art Research Center. Stehlen Sie dieses Buch is his first book to be translated into German (Literaturca Verlag). His novels are published in English, Macedonian, Arabics, Bulgarian, Albanian and Chinese. His 2000 Sait Faik Award-winning book "Bu Kitabı Çalın" (Steal This Book) "borrows" (or steals) its name from Abbie Hoffman's 1971 book "Steal This Book" and it is referred in the book as a postmodern parody.

Translations
Stehlen Sie dieses Buch, Literaturca Verlag, 2007.
Im Dunkeln, Wespennest 148, 2007.
De man die dacht dat hij Orhan Pamuk Was, Moderne Turkse verhalen, Atlas, 2005.
Crazy Old Man, Descant, 34:2, Sum 2003.
“My Life’s a Lie,” in Contemporary Turkish Short Fiction (Ed. Suat Karantay), Çitlenbik Publications, 2009.
“Marked in Writing” in The Book of Istanbul, (Ed. Jim Hinks & Gul Turner), Coma Press, 2010.
“A Week of Kindness in Istanbul,” in Aeolian Visions / Versions, Modern Classics and New Writing from Turkey, (Ed. Mel Kenne, Saliha Paker, Amy Spangler), Milet Publishing, 2013
“Versteck mich,” in Alles Blaue, alles Grüne dieser Welt, dtv Münhen, 2008.

References

External links

Literaturca Verlag
His Blog
Hayalet Gemi
Bogazici University
Bogazici University Press
Atlas
altkitap

Postmodern writers
Turkish essayists
Turkish novelists
1967 births
Living people